Saranga may refer to:

 Saranga (1994 film), a Pakistani action film
 Saranga (1961 film), a Bollywood film
 Șarânga, a village in the commune of Pietroasele, Romania
 Sharanga, the celestial bow of the Hindu God Lord Vishnu
 David Saranga (born 1964), Israel’s ambassador in Romania